Lycée Carnot de Tunis or Lycée pilote Bourguiba de Tunis formerly known as Collège Saint-Charles, It is a secondary school that opened on October 9, 1882 on Avenue Habib Thamer in Tunis.

Since 1983, the building has housed a typical high school, an establishment of the educational system in Tunisia bearing the name of former President Habib Bourguiba, himself a former student of the establishment.

History 
Lycée Carnot de Tunis is the heir to a struggle for influence between Italian schools and French schools, but also between religious congregations and republican institutions.

In 1845, Abbot Bourgade, chaplain of the Chapelle Saint-Louis de Carthage, created the first French college, the Saint-Louis college, located in the medina of Tunis. After thirteen years of existence, the college closes its doors. In 1875, Cardinal Charles Lavigerie decided to inaugurate a college in Carthage bearing the same name as the previous one. The day after the establishment of the French protectorate of Tunisia in 1881, it was decided to transfer the establishment to the capital. Étienne-Marius Arnoux, engineer-architect, is responsible for building the high school, on the model of the high schools in metropolitan France, on the edge of the current avenue de Paris. Its opening took place on October 9, 1882 in the new renowned Saint-Charles College establishment.

On November 2, 1889, the clergy ceded the Saint-Charles college to the French administration, which transformed it into a high school under the name of Sadiki high school in homage to Muhammad III as-Sadiq. To avoid confusion with the Sadiki College, it took the name of Lycée de Tunis by virtue of the beylical decree of September 29, 1893. In 1894, the Council of Ministers gave it the name of Sadi Carnot to honor the assassinated President of the French Republic. Due to the increasing number of schoolchildren, the buildings were enlarged in 1894, 1913, 1925 and 1939. During the Second World War, the school was requisitioned first by the Kommandantur of the German army Wehrmacht and then, in 1943, by Allied forces. During this period, the students are disseminated in the other establishments of Tunis.

In 1961, due to the Bizerte crisis, the start of the new school year did not take place until the first half of November in French establishments. To cope with the increase in staff, annexes were built in Carthage, Salammbô, Mutuelleville (1956) and La Marsa (1960).

Personalities linked to the school

Professors

Students

References

External link 
 Association of former students of the Lycée Carnot in Tunis carnottunis.com

French international schools in Tunisia
Educational institutions established in 1882
1880s establishments in Tunisia
1882 establishments in Africa